Kahnuj-e Shahrokhi (also Romanized as Kahnūj-e Shāhrokhī) is a village in Sarduiyeh Rural District, Sarduiyeh District, Jiroft County, Kerman Province, Iran. At the 2006 census, its population was 70, in 11 families.

References 

Populated places in Jiroft County